Peter Letsos (born January 1, 1979), aka Pete "The Greek," is a Brazilian Jiu-Jitsu black belt under Carlson Gracie Jr.

Biography 

Letsos is a 3X Pan Am medalist, as well as a 3X Gracie World Champion. He is known in Brazil for winning seven tournaments in one month.
 
Letsos began training in Jiu Jitsu in high school at the Carlson Gracie Academy in downtown Chicago, and won several matches in the Jiu Jitsu World Championships as a purple belt. He then lived and train Jiu Jitsu in Brazil for four years, spending many hours on the mat with Osvaldo Alves and Carlson Gracie.

He is featured in the book The Gracie Way by Jiu Jitsu journalist Kid Peligro.
 
Letsos has trained alongside many of the world's best Jiu Jitsu fighters and mixed martial artists, such as Fredson Paixao, André Galvão, Tony DeSouza, and Miguel Torres. He is friends with Eddie Bravo, Kenny Florian, Jeff Glover, and BJ Penn. Letsos lived and trained with Penn at his mixed martial arts academy in Hilo, Hawaii, where he eventually suffered a devastating injury to his neck while surfing.
 
Since then, Letsos' emphasis has been on training students in Brazilian Jiu Jitsu at his gym, Rio Jiu Jitsu Academy, in Chicago's Irving Park neighborhood.

Instructor lineage 
Mitsuyo "Count Koma" Maeda → Carlos Gracie, Sr. → Carlson Gracie → Carlson Gracie Jr. → Peter Letsos

External links 
 BJJ Heroes

See also
List of Brazilian Jiu-Jitsu practitioners

References

American practitioners of Brazilian jiu-jitsu
American people of Greek descent
Living people
1979 births